John Philip Cooper  (1923–2011) was a Professor of Agricultural Botany at the University of Wales. He was elected a Fellow of the Royal Society (FRS) in 1977, and appointed CBE in the 1983 Birthday Honours.

References

Commanders of the Order of the British Empire
Fellows of the Royal Society
People educated at Stockport Grammar School
Alumni of the University of Reading
1923 births
2011 deaths